Arkaba may refer to:

Arkaba Creek, a watercourse in South Australia
Arkaba Station, a sheep station in South Australia
Hundred of Arkaba, a cadastral unit in South Australia
SS Arkaba (1924), a ship
The Arkaba Projects, a collection of building projects in South Australia